Ernest Nelson may refer to:
 Ernest Charles Nelson (born 1951), botanist
 Ernest D. Nelson (1897–1961), politician
 Ernie Nelson (1874–1915), Australian rules footballer who played with South Melbourne